Joaquín Ariel Novillo (born 19 February 1998) is an Argentine professional footballer who plays as a centre-back for Colón on loan from Belgrano.

Club career
Novillo played for Belgrano at youth level, notably being selected as part of their squad for the 2016 Torneo di Viareggio in Italy. He was moved by Diego Osella into his senior squad after the 2018–19 Primera División's mid-season break, subsequently appearing for his senior bow in a goalless draw in the league with Unión Santa Fe on 27 January 2019; he participated in the full ninety minutes, picking up a yellow card in the process.

Once returning from a loan spell at Racing Club in 2021, Novillo was sent out on loan once again in January 2022, this time to Colón until the end of the year.

International career
In 2019, Novillo received an U23 call-up for Pan American Games in Peru. Argentina won the competition, as Novillo appeared in five matches.

Career statistics
.

Honours
Argentina U23
Pan American Games: 2019

References

External links

1998 births
Living people
Footballers from Córdoba, Argentina
Argentine footballers
Argentina youth international footballers
Association football defenders
Footballers at the 2019 Pan American Games
Pan American Games gold medalists for Argentina
Pan American Games medalists in football
Medalists at the 2019 Pan American Games
Argentine Primera División players
Club Atlético Belgrano footballers
Racing Club de Avellaneda footballers
Club Atlético Colón footballers
21st-century Argentine people